St Eustachius' Church, Tavistock is a Grade II* listed parish church in the Church of England Diocese of Exeter in Tavistock, Devon.

History
The church was established on this site as early as 1193 but certainly by 1265. Abbot Robert Champeaux of Tavistock Abbey rebuilt it in 1318. There was further building work in 1352 and 1380..

It was largely rebuilt in the 15th century when a new chancel was added at the east end. The south aisle was added between 1445 and 1447 as a bequest from Constance Coffyn.

There was a major restoration between 1844 and 1845 by the architect John Hayward when the Caen stone pulpit by Knight of Exeter, a new reading desk, an oak organ screen and carved pew ends were added. The gallery was removed. A new organ bay in the north aisle was added, along with vestries south of the chancel. It reopened for worship on 26 June 1845.

In 1896 the font was moved to the west end of the south aisle.

Another restoration was undertaken in 1902–03. The choir stalls were removed from the chancel and new marble flooring was installed. The nave and aisles were re-floored and the roofs were overhauled when rubs and wall plates were made good, and new figures of angels restored to the positions occupied previously by similar figures. New brass lighting pendants were suspended from the roof and the seating was re-spaced. The contractor was J.A. Dennis of Tavistock, and the architect George Fellowes Prynne.

The new reredos with riddels (curtains) to the design of A.S. Parker was carved by J.R. Hunt and dedicated on 19 May 1929.

Vicars
{{columns-list|colwidth=18em|
1309 Sir John de Cameleforde
1311 Sir John de Ockhampton
1318 Sir Robert Bodyer
1349 Richard de Bolham
1360 John, vicar of Boyton
1361 Baldwin Langdon
1382 David Bagatorre
???? Simon Tony
1391 John Hykedon, vicar of Landkey
1400 John Lucas
1416 Roger Sturt
1416 John Borneslo
???? John Baker
1427 Edmund Rawly
1434 William Mede
1439 John Kene
1443 John Skynner (or Shynner)
1460 Richard Haukeden
???? William Davy
1403 John Sargynt
1534 William Lawnder
1554 John Perins
???? Robert Knight
1584 Ralph Taylor
1585 Timothy Fisher
1587 Laurence Prychard
1592 Walter Ware
1600 Richard Adams
1603 John Ellistone
1612 Edward Elyott 
1632 John Blythman
???? Tristram Cleake
1638 George Hughes
1649 Thomas Larkham
1661 Samuel Brown(e)
1662 Thomas Glanvil
1673 Jasper Cann
1690 William Hame
1697 John Rennell
1701 Nathaniel Beard
1731 William Brown
1747 Thomas Salmon (later Bishop of Ferns and Leighlin)
1758 John Jago
1796 Richard Sleman
1812 Edward Atkyns Bray
1857 Osborne John Tancock 
1872 William John Tait
1883 Daniel Pring Alford
1895 Henry Godfrey Le Neveu
1918 Hugh Leslie Bickersteth 
1946 Basil Tudor Guy - 1956 (later Bishop of Gloucester)
1956 George Hodgshon
1966 Roy Wyndham Stevenson
1973 Richard Gilpin
1992 John Rawlings
2007 Michael Brierley (priest in charge)
2015 Christopher Hardwick
2022 Matt Godfrey

Organ

The first mention of an organ is in 1538/9 when it was noted that repairs were needed. By the 1790s there was a barrel organ in a gallery. In 1802 this was replaced, and the 1802 organ was replaced in 1825.

The current organ was built by J.W. Walker and Sons. It was opened by Samuel Sebastian Wesley on 25 June 1846.

The carved statues on the organ case were added in 1879. There were later modifications and additions by Hele and Company of Plymouth and Lance Foy which has resulted in a three manual organ with 51 stops. A specification of the organ can be found in the National Pipe Organ Register.

Organists
Initially the salary of the organist was funded by the Duke of Bedford, but by 1875 the salary had reached £61 10s per annum and Francis Russell, 9th Duke of Bedford decided it was time for the congregation to fund it. At the time, the pew rents generated £120 per annum, with expenses of running the church at £118 per annum.
Samuel Sebastian Wesley 1846
John Frederick Thynne 1846 - 1877
Alexander Luke Vingoe 1877 - 1878
Charles John Vincent 1878  - 1883 (formerly organist of St Mark's Church, Sunderland, afterwards organist of Christ Church, Hampstead)
John Tomlinson 1883 - 1906
William Clotworthy 1907 - 1942 (formerly organist of St Mary Magdalene's Church, Launceston)
Harold Charles Lake 1942 - 1956

Bells
The tower contains a peal of 10 bells The eight bells of 1925 by John Taylor and Company of Loughborough were expanded to 10 in 1998 by the addition of two new bells by the same founder.

References

Tavistock
Tavistock